Area H was one of the eight district electoral areas (DEA) which existed in Belfast, Northern Ireland from 1973 to 1985. Located in the north of the city, it covered the Antrim and Shore Road areas, together with parts of the Cliftonville area. The district elected seven members to Belfast City Council and contained the wards of Bellevue, Castleview; Cavehill, Cliftonville; Duncairn; Fortwilliam; and Grove. The DEA largely formed part of the Belfast North constituency.

History
The area was created for the 1973 local government elections. It combined the whole of the former Duncairn ward with part of the Clifton ward and parts of Newtownabbey Urban District. It was abolished for the 1985 local government elections. The Cliftonville ward became part of the new Oldpark DEA. The remaining six wards became the Castle DEA.

Results

1973

1977

1981

1984 by-election
Following the death of the DUP's William Annon in October 1983, a by-election was held on 23 February 1984.

References

Former District Electoral Areas of Belfast
1973 establishments in Northern Ireland
1985 disestablishments in Northern Ireland